The Maternity and Parental Leave etc. Regulations 1999 (SI 1999/3312) is a statutory instrument, concerning UK labour law, which details the rights to maternity and parental leave for employees in the United Kingdom.

Contents
r 4(1) 'An employee is entitled to ordinary maternity leave and to additional maternity leave' if she notifies the employer of expected birth at least 15 weeks before (3 and a half months) (1A) and the date can be varied with 28 days' notice (2) in writing if the employer wants it, and it can start any time up to eleven weeks before the expected week of birth
[r 5 used to require a 26-week qualifying period by the 14th week before the expected week of childbirth, repealed by SI 2006/2014]
r 6 maternity leave is automatically triggered by absence of work 'wholly or partly because of pregnancy' in the four weeks before the expected week
r 7, right to 18 weeks' ordinary (paid) maternity leave and 29 weeks' additional (unpaid) maternity leave (6) to return to work 28 days' notice should be given, (7) no notice needed if the full period of leave is taken
r 8, two weeks' compulsory leave and four weeks for factory workers, or longer where statute requires
r 9 Exclusion of entitlement to remuneration during ordinary maternity leave
r 10 Redundancy during maternity leave
r 11, the mother must give 21 days' notice of her intention to return during a maternity leave period, and if not lose pay.
r 12, requirement to notify intention to return at which point after additional maternity leave, if requested by the employer, and if not lose dismissal and detriment protection.
r 13 employees that have worked a year and expect to have responsibility for a child can take parental leave for the purpose of caring for that child
r 14 thirteen weeks for any individual child
r 15 the right drops away (a) after the child's fifth birthday (b) or eighteenth birthday for a disabled child (c) or five years and before the eighteenth birthday of an adopted child
r 16 if an employee's contract contains no provisions on parental leave, and there is no applicable collective agreement, then the default rules in Sch 2 apply
r 17(a) an employee who takes additional maternity leave retains the right to mutual trust and confidence, compensation for redundancy, disciplinary and grievance procedures and (b) is bound by all the corresponding rights to good faith
r 18 a woman is entitled to the job she had before absence after ordinary leave; or another suitable and appropriate job if returning after additional leave
r 18A the right to return means at the same seniority, with the same pension and pay, or terms not less favourable
r 20 a prescribed kind of reason for unfair dismissal is where the employee is redundant and r 10 (right to suitable alternative employment if redundant) is not complied with
r 20(3) a prescribed kind of reason for unfair dismissal is (a) pregnancy (b) birth (c) suspension on medical grounds under ERA 1996 s 66(2) (d) seeking to take maternity leave (e) seeking to take (i) additional maternity leave (ee) failing to return where there was (i) no rr 7(6)-(7) notification (ii) the employer gave less than 28 days' notice. [r 20(6) was removed by 2000/73/EC and one of the four amending instruments]
r 20(7) not a prescribed kind of dismissal, for a woman on ordinary or additional maternity leave, where (a) not reasonably practicable, (b) an associated employer has a job, and (c) she accepts or unreasonably refuses the offer
r 21 employees can take whichever is more favourable out of the contractual or statutory entitlement, but not both
Sch 2, paras 1-5, evidence of parenthood may be provided, and 21 days' notice to take the leave should be given
para 6, the employer can postpone leave for up to six months if business would be 'unduly disrupted'
para 7, leave can be taken only in blocks of not less than one week at a time, unless the child gets a disability living allowance
para 8, no more than four weeks in any one year can be taken

Related provisions
The Social Security Contributions and Benefits Act 1992 sections 164-171 contain rules relating to the level of pay for people while on maternity leave.

s 165, the maximum paid maternity leave period can be set at [52 weeks].
s 166, statutory maternity pay is 90% of one's normal average weekly earnings for 6 weeks.
s 167, employers are reimbursed according to their size and national insurance contributions.

The Statutory Maternity Pay Regulations 1986 (SI 1986/1960) regulation 6, which is periodically updated, contains the amount for statutory maternity pay.

r 6, for the remaining period of paid maternity leave, the rate is [£128.73] per week (since 3 April 2011).

See also

Child care in the United Kingdom
Tax credits
Child tax credit
Working Tax Credit

Notes

References

External links

United Kingdom labour law
Statutory Instruments of the United Kingdom
1999 in British law
Parental leave in the United Kingdom
1999 in labor relations
Maternity in the United Kingdom